Parliamentary elections were held in Cuba on 11 March 2018 to elect members of the National Assembly of People's Power. Prior to the elections, President Raúl Castro declared he would not be seeking a new term, and a new President of the Council of State will be elected by the National Assembly. His deputy, Miguel Díaz-Canel, was subsequently elected as the new president. However, Castro remained the First Secretary of the Communist Party of Cuba, the most senior position in the country.

Electoral system
All Cuban citizens who are over the age of 18 years, and possess full political rights for at least five years prior to the election are eligible to partake within the election. 50% of candidates must be nominated by people from the municipality and elected by direct vote in local assemblies, where people decide who they consider to have the qualities to best represent them. The other 50% of candidates are proposed by candidacy commissions which comprise representatives of workers, youth, women, students, and farmers, as well as members of the Committees for the Defense of the Revolution. The final list of candidates, which corresponds to the number of seats to be filled, is drawn up by the National Candidacy Commission taking into account criteria such as candidates' merit, patriotism, ethical values, and revolutionary history.

Voter requirements are set within article 132 of the Cuban constitution. All voters must be Cuban citizens who have reached the age of 16 years, who have not been declared mentally disabled by a court, and who have not committed a crime. The electoral system is designed to give the winner of the election a majority. To be declared elected, one candidate must obtain more than 50% of the valid votes cast in the constituency in which they are running. If this is not attained, the seat in question remains vacant unless the Council of State decides to hold a second round of voting.

Results
On 12 March, the Cuba National Election Commission (CNE) released preliminary results. In a press conference, the CNE reported that all 605 candidates had been elected as Deputies to the National Assembly. Selective votes refer to voters who voted for either their National Assembly Deputy, or their Provincial Representative, but not both.

By province

Notes

References

Cuba
Parliamentary
Parliamentary elections in Cuba
Cuba
One-party elections
Single-candidate elections